Mycoacia is a genus of toothed crust fungi in the family Meruliaceae. It was circumscribed by Dutch mycologist Marinus Anton Donk in 1931.

Species
, Index Fungorum accepts 18 species of Mycoacia:
Mycoacia angustata H.S.Yuan (2012) – China
Mycoacia aurea (Fr.) J.Erikss. & Ryvarden (1976) – Europe
Mycoacia austro-occidentalis Canf. (1976)
Mycoacia bulliardii (Nikol.) Parmasto (1967)
Mycoacia chrysella (Berk. & M.A.Curtis) H.Furuk. (1974)
Mycoacia flava (Cejp) Parmasto (1967)
Mycoacia fuscoatra (Fr.) Donk (1931)
Mycoacia heterocystidia (Sheng H.Wu) Spirin & Zmitr. (2004) – Taiwan
Mycoacia kurilensis Parmasto (1967)
Mycoacia lutea (G.Cunn.) Hjortstam (1995)
Mycoacia meridionalis Burds. & Nakasone (1981)
Mycoacia nothofagi (G.Cunn.) Ryvarden (1981) – Europe; New Zealand; Asia
Mycoacia odontoidea (Sheng H.Wu) Spirin & Zmitr. (2004)
Mycoacia rubiginosa Hjortstam & Ryvarden (2004) – Colombia
Mycoacia squalina (Fr.) M.P.Christ. (1960)
Mycoacia stenodon (Pers.) Donk (1931)
Mycoacia subconspersa (Rick) Hjortstam & Ryvarden (1982)
Mycoacia uda (Fr.) Donk (1931) – Europe

References

Taxa described in 1931
Meruliaceae
Polyporales genera
Taxa named by Marinus Anton Donk